is a Japanese footballer currently playing as a defensive midfielder for Vissel Kobe.

Career statistics

Club
.

Notes

References

External links

2002 births
Living people
Japanese footballers
Association football midfielders
Vissel Kobe players